The New Jersey Museum of Agriculture was an American agriculture museum, located in North Brunswick, New Jersey, and focused on the evolution of agriculture in New Jersey.

The museum's exhibits included farm tools and machinery, household implements, scientific instruments, trade tools, farm vehicles, early electrical appliances and a general store.  Other displays told the story of important agricultural crops in New Jersey, including apples, cranberries, tomatoes, blueberries, corn and potatoes.

History and operations
The museum opened in 1990 and was located on the campus of the School of Environmental and Biological Sciences of Rutgers University at 103 College Farm Road. It featured the collection of Professor Wabun C. Krueger, including the Deats plow, patented in 1828 by John Deats of Hunterdon County and manufactured by his son, Hiram Deats. The museum was closed in 2011 due to state budget cuts.

Part of the museum's collection of photographs of farms and barns in Monmouth and Mercer Counties were donated to the Monmouth County Archives.

Building
After closing, the land and the 30,000 sqft building reverted to Rutgers University and used for several years as classrooms and storage. From 2016 - 2019, the George Street Playhouse leased the building while their original location was razed for the construction of the downtown New Brunswick Performing Arts Center.   In 2019, Rutgers announced plans to convert the building into a state-of-art Makerspace / Hackerspace hosting a variety of tools, CNC equipment, woodshop, metal fabrication, 3D Printing, textiles, commercial kitchen, and arts&crafts. In addition to serving University students, it will be available to public memberships similar to a gym model.

See also

 Agriculture in the United States
 List of museums in New Jersey

References

1990 establishments in New Jersey
2011 disestablishments in New Jersey
Agriculture museums in the United States
Buildings and structures in New Brunswick, New Jersey
Defunct museums in New Jersey
History museums in New Jersey
Museums disestablished in 2011
Museums established in 1990
Museums in Middlesex County, New Jersey
Rutgers University
University museums in New Jersey
Tourist attractions in New Brunswick, New Jersey